Mustafa Zahid (born 18 December 1984) is a Pakistani music composer who achieved success with his 2007 singles "Toh Phir Aao" and "Tera Mera Rishta". He is also the band leader and the lead vocalist of Roxen, a rock band which was formed in 2004.

Early life

Mustafa was born into a Muslim family in Lahore, Punjab, Pakistan. He is the cousin of Ali Azmat, who was the lead vocalist of the famous rock band Junoon, and is also related to the late Sufi kalam singer, actor, director and producer Inayat Hussain Bhatti. From childhood he never thought that he would become a singer. He was daring from his young age and done anchoring for the college function. During that he was asked to sing some song by the professors. He hesitatingly sang bheegi bheegi raton me song for about 2 lines. From this he got lot of motivation to become a singer.

Mainstream and Bollywood

In mid-2007, two of his songs were used in the Bollywood movie Awarapan and he has performed in outside of Pakistan, including Glasgow and Bahrain.

Roxen

Their debut album titled Roxen-E-Dewaar was released in late 2006 and remained on top of all charts in Pakistan for almost six weeks. The Indian release of the album was scheduled in mid December 2008, but was put on hold by Indian label after the recent Mumbai Attacks. Universal Music has signed Mustafa Zahid and Roxen (band) for a worldwide release of their Upcoming Album.

Discography

Albums

Singles

Bollywood

Lollywood

Pakistani Drama Soundtrack

International

See also
 List of Pakistani musicians
 List of Pakistani musical groups
 Pakistani pop music

References

External links
 Rox3n – Roxen's Official Website
 
 

1984 births
Pakistani Muslims
Living people
Pakistani composers
Pakistani male singers
Musicians from Lahore
National College of Arts alumni
Government College University, Lahore alumni
Urdu playback singers
Pakistani people of Kashmiri descent